Chaetoglossa is a genus of flies in the family Tachinidae.

Species
C. nigripalpis Townsend, 1892
C. picticornis Townsend, 1892

References

Diptera of North America
Exoristinae
Tachinidae genera
Taxa named by Charles Henry Tyler Townsend